Lorenzo Costa may refer to:
Lorenzo Costa, Italian painter during the Renaissance
Lorenzo Costa the Younger, Italian painter during the Renaissance, not related to Lorenzo Costa
Lorenzo Costa (cyclist), Italian cyclist in the 1922 Tour de France